Nepalis in Russia comprises residents from Nepal in Russia, including temporary expatriates and permanent residents, as well as their locally born descendants.

Migration history
Nepalese students moved to then-Soviet Russia and other countries that were formally under the Soviet Union. The USSR trained thousands of students from developing countries in a variety of fields. Over 6,000 Nepalis have graduated from Russian and former Soviet universities as lawyers, journalists, doctors and engineers.

Many of the students have married and settled there. After the fall of the Soviet Union, Nepalese entrepreneurs who settled down in Russia took the lead in investing in private hydropower projects and many other ventures in their home country.

Notable people
  Anish Giri - Chess prodigy

References

Asian diaspora in Russia
Ethnic groups in Russia
 
Russia